Big Brother Panamá is the Panamanian version of the reality television franchise Big Brother. It was the first season of the show, and it began to be broadcast on 31 August 2016 on TVN, Rolando Sterling hosted the main show and Gaby Garrido hosted the El Debate. In this season the grand prize was $25,000.

The house that was used for the first season was the Gran Hermano Argentina house.

Katherine Sandoval won the series on Day 92.

Housemates

Nominations table
The first housemate in each box was nominated for two points, and the second housemate was nominated for one point.

Notes

 : The first round of nominations took place on week 2.
 : Ángel and Fergie were nominated by Big Brother for breaking the rules.
 : Ángel was ejected for aggressive behavior.

Repechage

External links 
 Official site

Panama
TVN (Panamanian TV network) original programming
2010s Panamanian television series
2016 Panamanian television series debuts
2016 Panamanian television series endings